Mohamad Hafiz bin Ramdan (born 28 June 1993) is a Malaysian professional footballer who plays as a midfielder for Malaysia Super League side Negeri Sembilan FC .

Club Career 
In 2021 Hafiz Ramdan signed for Sri Pahang FC.

He was officially announced as a new Negeri Sembilan FC player on 14 January 2023.

Career statistics

Club

References

External links
 

1993 births
Living people
Malaysian footballers
Perak F.C. players
Negeri Sembilan FC players
People from Perak
Malaysia Super League players
Malaysia international footballers
Association football forwards